Smile Network International is an American non-profit, humanitarian organization that specializes in providing free surgeries for impoverished children in developing countries who are born with cleft lips and palates.

The organization provides reconstructive surgeries and related healthcare services to impoverished children and young adults in developing countries.

Smile Network International was founded in 2003 by American businesswoman, Kim Valentini. Since 2003, the organization has completed 60 missions and provided 3,000 free operations on children and adults in 11 countries (Mexico, Guatemala, Haiti, Ecuador, Peru. Armenia, Inda, Vietnam, Uganda, Tanzania and Kenya.

See also
 Cleft lip and palate organisations

References

 Smilenetwork.org Website https://web.archive.org/web/20090502200347/http://www.smilenetwork.org/Smile_Network/Donate.html
 Smilenetwork.org Website https://web.archive.org/web/20100623023636/http://www.smilenetwork.org/Smile_Network/Mission_Calendar.html

External links
 Official site

Charities based in Minnesota
Health charities in the United States
Medical and health organizations based in Minnesota